Synesthesia is a studio album by Canadian hip hop musician Buck 65. It was originally released on Endemik Music in 2001 and then re-released with additional songs and music on WEA in 2002.

Track listing

References

External links
 

2001 albums
Buck 65 albums